AACA may refer to:

 AACA Museum in Hershey, PA. 
 All Assam Chess Association
 American Association of Clinical Anatomists
 American Anti-Corruption Act
 American Assets Capital Advisers, investment management company, based in San Diego, California